Leonard Sharp may refer to:

 Leonard Sharp (actor)
 Leonard Sharp (doctor)
 Leonard Sharp (trade unionist)